Kash... Aap Hamare Hote  (translation: Wish... You Were Mine) is a 2003 Indian drama film. The film starred Juhi Babbar in her film debut. The film was directed by Ravindra Peepat and music was composed by Aadesh Shrivastava.

Plot
Amrita is the adopted daughter of Yashwant Raj Mankotia. Amrita was actually the daughter of late Yashwant Raj's friend. Yashwant has a son, Randeep Raj Mankotia who is in Canada. Yashwant plans to get Randeep and Amrita married. Randeep does not want to go to India to visit his father. To make Randeep come to Yashwant pretends to have heart trouble. Randeep does not want to leave his business. He gets even more upset when he learns that he is going to marry Amrita. His father says if he does not accept the marriage all his property will go to Amrita. Randeep agrees to the marriage. After the wedding, Randeep and Amrita travel to Canada. When they go to Randeep's house, Amrita meets Simone, Randeep's business partner/spouse. Simone and Randeep humiliate Amrita and she runs away. Randeep gathers some men and orders them to find Amrita and kill her. Amrita then hides in the garage of Jay Kumar  who befriends her. Daljit  Brar [Dolly] (Ravee Gupta) is the daughter of Jay's boss and is jealous of the friendship between them so she fires Jay. Yashwant Raj misses Amrita so he goes to Canada to visit her. When Yashwant asks where Amrita is Randeep lies and says she has humiliated him by taking up alcohol. Yashwant doesn't believes this, he goes to find her and the truth. Afterwards he finds out that his son has not only disgraced Amrita but it fact doing illegal business of drugs with Simone. After a brawl Yashwant kills his son and he later discharged by the court, and he decides to go back home while blessing Amrita and Jay.

Cast
 Sonu Nigam as Jay Kumar
 Juhi Babbar as Amrita Raj Mankotia
 Om Puri as Yashwant Raj Mankotia
Sharad Kapoor as Randeep "Ronny" Raj Mankotia
 Saadhika as Simone
 Raavee Gupta as	Daljit Brar (Dolly)
 Raj Babbar as  Sardar Teja Singh Brar
 Johnny Lever as Native Indian

Soundtracks
 "Chalte Chalte" – Sonu Nigam
 "Dhaani Chunariya" – Alka Yagnik
 "Dil Main Sau"—Manmohan Singh
 "Hai Rabba"—Manmohan Singh
 "Hum Bhi Mohabbat"—Sonu Nigam
 "Kash Aap Hamare Hote" – Sad—Sonu Nigam
 "Kash Aap Hamare Hote"—Sonu Nigam, Alka Yagnik
 "Mera Hindustan Hai"—Sonu Nigam
 "Shaava Perdesio"—Sonu Nigam, Sukhwinder Singh
 "Tumse Hui"—Sonu Nigam, Anuradha Paudwal

Critical reception
Taran Adarsh of IndiaFM gave the film 1 star out of 5, writing ″On the whole, KASH AAP HAMARE HOTE is an ordinary fare. At the box-office, the film will face rough weather due to a strong opposition in the form of 2003 Cricket World Cup. Had the film released at a more appropriate period and without oppositions, the prospects would've been better.″ Sukanya Verma of Rediff.com wrote ″The best thing about the film is Manmohan Singh's cinematography. A Yash Chopra regular, Singh captures gorgeous Canada beautifully.″But then, films do not run on stunning locations, technical superiority or catchy music. Kash... simply lacks appeal in all other departments.″

References

External links 

2000s Hindi-language films
2003 films
Films scored by Aadesh Shrivastava
Films shot in Vancouver
Films set in Vancouver
Films about illegal immigration